Maitreyi may refer to:

Maitreyi, an ancient Indian philosopher
Maitreyi Devi, an Indian writer in Bengali
Bengal Nights or Maitreyi, a novel by Mircea Eliade exploring his relationship with Devi
Maitreyi Pushpa, an Indian writer in Hindi
Maitreyi College, a women's college in New Delhi
Maitreyi Ramakrishnan, a Canadian actress

See also
Maitreya (disambiguation)
Maitrayaniya Upanishad